|}

The Guisborough Stakes is a Listed flat horse race in Great Britain open to horses aged three years and over.
It is run at Redcar over a distance of 7 furlongs (1,408 metres), and it is scheduled to take place each year in early October.

The race was first run in 2003.

Records
Most successful horse since 2003:
 No horse has won this race on more than one occasion

Leading jockey since 2003 (2 wins):
 Tom Eaves – Council Member (2005), New Seeker (2006)
Dane O'Neill – Muteela (2014), Jallota (2017)

Leading trainer since 2003 (3 wins):
 Saeed bin Suroor – Gonfilia (2004), Council Member (2005), Il Warrd (2008)

Winners

See also
 Horse racing in Great Britain
 List of British flat horse races

References 
Racing Post: 

Open mile category horse races
Redcar Racecourse
Flat races in Great Britain
Recurring sporting events established in 2003
2003 establishments in England